The fourth election to the Powys County Council since local government reorganization in Wales in 1995 was held on 1 May 2012.  It was preceded by the 2008 election and was followed by the 2017 election. The Independent group retained a majority on the authority

Results Overview
Independents Retained Overall control.
 

|}

Ward Results (Brecknockshire)

Aber-craf (one seat)
Incumbent elected unopposed at last election (not standing again)

Bronllys (one seat)

Builth (one seat)

Bwlch (one seat)

Crickhowell (one seat)

Cwmtwrch (one seat)

Felin-fach (one seat)

Gwernyfed (one seat)
Incumbent elected unopposed at last election

Hay (one seat)

Llanafanfawr (one seat)

Llangattock (one seat)
Jeff Holmes was elected as a Liberal Democrat in 2008.

Llangors (one seat)
The sitting member was previously a Liberal Democrat. Incumbent elected unopposed at last election.

Llangynidr (one seat)

Llanwrtyd Wells (one seat)

Maescar / Llywel (one seat)

St Davids Within (one seat)
The successful candidate had been elected as an Independent councilor for St John Ward in 2008 but now captured this ward from the Independents

St John (one seat)

St Mary (one seat)

Talgarth (one seat)

Talybont-on-Usk (one seat)
The sitting member was elected as a Liberal Democrat in 2008.

Tawe Uchaf (one seat)

Ynyscedwyn (one seat)

Yscir (one seat)

Ystradgynlais (one seat)

Ward Results (Montgomeryshire)

Banwy (one seat)

Berriew (one seat)

Blaen Hafren (one seat)

Caersws (one seat)

Churchstoke (one seat)

Dolforwyn (one seat)

Forden (one seat)

Glantwymyn (one seat)

Guilsfield (one seat)

Kerry (one seat)

Llanbrynmair (one seat)

Llandinam (one seat)

Llandrinio (one seat)

Llandysilio (one seat)

Llanfair Caereinion (one seat)

Llanfihangel (one seat)

Llanfyllin (one seat)

Llanidloes (one seat)

Llanwddyn (one seat)

Llanrhaeadr-ym-Mochnant (one seat)

Llansantffraid (one seat)

Machynlleth (one seat)

Meifod (one seat)

Montgomery (one seat)

Newtown Llanllwchaiaran North (one seat)

Newtown Llanllwchaiaran West

Newtown Central (one seat)

Newtown East (one seat)
The sitting member had been elected as a Liberal Democrat in 2008 but subsequently joined the Conservatives.

Newtown South (one seat)

Rhiwcynon (one seat)

Trewern (one seat)

Welshpool Castle (one seat)

Welshpool Gungrog (one seat)

Welshpool Llanerchyddol (one seat)

Ward Results (Radnorshire)

Beguildy (one seat)

Disserth and Trecoed (one seat)

Glasbury (one seat)

Knighton (one seat)

Llanbadarn Fawr (one seat)

Llandrindod East/West (one seat)

Llandrindod North (one seat)
Gary Price previously represented a different ward as an Independent.

Llandrindod South (one seat)
The previous Conservative councilor stood as an Independent.

Llanelwedd (one seat)

Llangunllo (one seat)

Llanyre (one seat)

Nantmel (one seat)

Old Radnor (one seat)

Presteigne (one seat)
The sitting member had previously stood as a Liberal Democrat.

Rhayader (one seat)

By-Elections 2012-2017

Glasbury by-election 2015
A by-election was held in Glasbury on 13 August 2015 following the resignation of Chris Davies, who was elected MP for Brecon and Radnor at the 2015 General Election.

Welshpool Llanerchyddol by-election 2016

A by-election was held in Welshpool Llanerchyddol on 15 December 2016 following the death of Ann Holloway.

See also
 List of electoral wards in Powys

References

2012
powys